The Black is an epithet for the following:

People
 Alan the Black (died 1098), second lord of Richmond
 Alan, 1st Earl of Richmond (died 1146), Breton noble
 Benedict the Moor or the Black (1526–1589), Italian saint of the Catholic and Lutheran Churches
 Berthold Schwarz or the Black, 14th century Franciscan friar and alchemist who, according to legend, was the first European to discover gunpowder
 Cleitus the Black (c. 375 BC–328 BC), one of Alexander the Great's officers
 Dub, King of Scotland (died 967), called Niger ("the Black")
 Enrique of Malacca, a slave of Ferdinand Magellan also known as Henry the Black, probably the first person to circumnavigate the world
 Ermoldus Nigellus or Niger (fl. 824–830), translated Ermold the Black, a poet at the court of Pippin of Aquitaine
 Ewald the Black (died c. 695), one of the Two Ewalds, Christian saint and martyr
 Fulk III, Count of Anjou (c. 987–1040)
 Halfdan the Black (c. 810–c. 860), King of Vestfold (in present-day Norway)
 Halfdan Haraldsson the Black, a Norwegian petty king and grandson of the above
 Henry III, Holy Roman Emperor (1017–1056)
 Henry IX, Duke of Bavaria (died 1126) 
 Hugh the Black (died 952), Duke of Burgundy
 Leszek II the Black (c. 1241–1288), High Duke of the Kingdom of Poland
 Reginald II, Duke of Guelders (c. 1295–1343)
 Mikołaj "the Black" Radziwiłł (1515–1565), Lithuanian nobleman
 Moses the Black (330–405), ascetic monk and priest in Egypt, saint in various Christian faiths
 Olaf the Black (1173/4–1237), King of Mann and the Isles (mostly in present-day Scotland)
 Óttarr svarti or Óttarr the Black, 11th century Icelandic skald
 Theodore the Black (died 1298), Russian Orthodox saint
 Zawisza Czarny (c. 1379–1428), also known as Zawisza the Black of Garbów and the Black Knight, Polish nobleman, soldier and diplomat

Legendary and fictional characters
 Saint Sarah, patron saint of the Romani people
 The Black Stallion or the Black, title character of author Walter Farley's series
 Ancalagon the Black, the greatest dragon in J. R. R. Tolkien's fantasy universe
 Ulfang the Black, a chieftain of the Easterlings (First Age) in Tolkien's universe 
 Vykin the Black, the first black DC Comics superhero
 Goku Black (sometimes called Goku the Black), a Dragon Ball villain

See also
 Kali, a Hindu goddess also known as "the black one"
 Surtr, a Norse jötunn whose name means "black" or "swarthy"
 Edward, the Black Prince (1330–1376), son of Edward III and father of Richard II
 Archibald Douglas, 3rd Earl of Douglas (1328-1400), Scottish nobleman also known as Black Archibald
 Karađorđe (1762-1817) ("Black George"), Serbian revolutionary leader
 Gwladus Ddu or "the Dark" (died 1251), Welsh princess
 Black Baron (disambiguation)
 Black knight (disambiguation)
 List of people known as the White
 List of people known as the Red

Lists of people by epithet